State Route 110 (SR 110) is a  state highway in the central part of the U.S. state of Alabama. The western terminus of the highway is at an intersection with SR 126 within sight of the Interstate 85 (I-85) and U.S. Route 80 (US 80) interchange in the eastern part of Montgomery. The eastern terminus of the highway is at an intersection with US 82 west of Union Springs, Alabama.

Route description

From its beginning, it heads southeast from Montgomery County into rural areas of that county. It has an incomplete interchange with SR 108 (which is the placeholder for the future re-routing of I-85 around Montgomery. It then has an intersection with the southern terminus of SR 293. It then enters Bullock County. Along its two-lane roadway, the highway travels through a number of small, unincorporated communities and farmland as it heads towards Union Springs.

Major intersections

See also

References

110
Transportation in Montgomery County, Alabama
Transportation in Bullock County, Alabama
Highways in Montgomery, Alabama